Glory to the Brave is the debut album by the Swedish heavy metal band HammerFall, released in 1997. Despite the fact that the band was formed in 1993, HammerFall performed mostly live music and covers before this album was released. "Steel Meets Steel" was composed by Oscar Dronjak just before the band was formed and is included on this album. The band signed a deal with the Dutch label Vic Records. Nuclear Blast approached Vic Records and obtained a license deal for the album. Later, Nuclear Blast bought the entire rights from Vic Records. Although the In Flames guitarist Jesper Strömblad was listed as the drummer, all the drums were actually played by session musician Patrik Räfling, who joined the band as a full-time member shortly after the album's release.

The cover art was painted by Andreas Marschall.

"I Believe" was co-written with Peter Stålfors of Pure X and, later, the more famous Dream Evil.

Glory to the Brave was re-released in 2002 as a Deluxe Edition with the Stormwitch cover "Ravenlord" as a bonus track as well as a multimedia section including a music video.

Critical reception

In 2005, Glory to the Brave was ranked number 295 in [[Rock Hard (magazine)|Rock Hard]] magazine's book of The 500 Greatest Rock & Metal Albums of All Time. In 2020, it was named one of the 20 best metal albums of 1997 by Metal Hammer magazine.

Track listing

An eleventh track on the enhanced CD (bonus deluxe edition) contained multimedia content: a videoclip, wallpaper and e-card

"Ravenlord" was released on the Japanese, Brazilian and deluxe editions.

Special editions:
LP, Shape CD (Saw-Shaped), Picture LP, Red Vinyl LP, Deluxe Edition
(containing bonus material), Value Box (with "Renegade" CDs)

Personnel
Joacim Cans – lead vocals, background harmonies
Oscar Dronjak – guitars, backing vocals
Fredrik Larsson – bass, backing vocals
Glenn Ljungström – guitars
Jesper Strömblad – drums (writing credit only)
Patrik Räfling – drums

References

External links
Official HammerFall website
HammerFall - Glory to the Brave
Glory to the Brave Deluxe Edition

1997 debut albums
HammerFall albums
Nuclear Blast albums
Albums recorded at Studio Fredman
Albums produced by Fredrik Nordström